opened in Chikuma, Nagano Prefecture, Japan, in 1994. Its focus is the archaeology (buried cultural properties) and documentary history of Nagano Prefecture.

See also
 List of Historic Sites of Japan (Nagano)
 Shinano Province

References

External links
  Nagano Prefectural Museum of History

Museums in Nagano Prefecture
Chikuma, Nagano
Museums established in 1994
1994 establishments in Japan